Cyclospasm is the contraction of the ciliary muscle in the eye, in the accommodation of focus for near vision. Cyclospasm  may also exert tensions on the trabecular meshwork, opening the pores and facilitating outflow of the aqueous humour into the canal of Schlemm. The increase in aqueous humour outflow is desirable for patients with glaucoma.

Symptoms 
Symptoms are the same as in the case of Myopia. Some of the most common symptoms are: tiredness of the eyes while looking at close objects, eye ache, headache.

Reasons  
Primary reasons is eye fatigue as a result of excessive pressure on the eyes because of reading, watching TV, computer, poor lighting, etc. Some other reasons are poor posture, poor diet, lack of sleep, etc.

Treatment 
There are different ways to treat cyclospasm. Some doctors recommend special eye drops and taking care of your hygiene, while eye exercises and healthy diet is also vital for good eyesight. There are no surgical treatment.

If cyclospasm is not treated at its early stages, it may lead to myopia.

Ophthalmology